Garur is a town in the Bageshwar district of the state of Uttarakhand, India.

Administration
Garur is one of the Sub Divisions in Bageshwar District. Sub Divisional Magistrate (SDM) office is situated nearby at Purda. Besides SDM Office, Tehsil Headquarter is also in Purda. Presently Shri Jaywardhan Sharma is SDM of Garur sub division. Block office of Garud Block is located in Gadsher Village. Garur has forest range office at Gadkhet and Baijnath.

The Garur Nagar Panchayat was established on 23 July 2021.

Geography and demographics
Garur town spreads in a vast valley formed by glaciation and river erosion of Gomati and Garur Ganga. The climate of Garur is Sub-tropical to temperate lowest temperature ranging around 5° celsius and highest up to 35° celsius.

Nearby places include Kausani, Baijnath, Kot Bhramari Gwaldam and Bageshwar.

The neighbouring villages also include Garhsher,Matena, Gagrigol, Chitrapal, Tilsari, Salani, Mattee, Bheta, Lobanj, Dangoli, Wajula, Dhaina. Garur is about 16 km away from Kausani. From Garur about 25 km is Gwaldam which comes in Garhwal.

Some of villages nearby Garur are Silli, Amoli, Matena (Joshikhola), Darsani, Anna, Paye, Jijoli, Bhagartola, Dyonai, Motisyari, Baijnath, Shemar and Kajuli.

Heritage
The regions around Garur are characterised by several historical sites mainly Temples, Naulas and various other archeological remains. It has the historical privilege of once being the capital of Katyuri Dynasty that ruled over the Kumaon region during 13th and 14th century.

Around 5–6 km from Garur there is a temple of Bhagwati Mata (Kot Ka Mandir) (traces of Ma Bhramri can be found in the last two paragraph of Chapter Eleven of Durga Shaptashati Path), which once was a fort owned by the Katyuri Kings. The guru Adi Shankar stayed on this temple  while en route to Badrinath while coming back from Pataal Bhuwneshwar and earlier closing the ears of Lord Shiva at Jageswar in the same entour. Nearby, the Chakrwarti samraat  Arun  also use to come from a hole from Paataal  (near the village of Garhsher) as cited in Durgasaptsati Yad Arunkhy Mahaabaadhaa Karoti Tadaa Aham ashankhy shatpadam and will kill that Mahaasuram. There is widespread belief among the local populace that the face of the goddess Kot Bhramri Devi, should not be shown to anyone except the priest of the temple. It is said that if this advice is not followed, the entire Katur Valley will face ill luck and a massive disaster will follow. Hence only the rear side of the goddess is worshipped, except during the annual festival of "Nandaashtmi" during Bhadrapad Ashtami or Radha Ashtami during September month (the state government declares as State holiday) or when the Raj Jaat Yatra which takes place once in twelve years. In the last 150 years, buffalo and lamb used to be sacrificed in the name of Nandaashtami. However, this practice has been stopped by The Honorable High Court of Nainital on a Public Interest Litigation filed by the Animal Protection Society; it is enforced by police protection. Though the Goddess Ma Bhramri is Satvik but some 200 years back during the Nepalese invasion and their kingdom, local deity Ma Nandadevi's status was installed at Kot Bhramri Mandir as a result animal sacrifice began two centuries earlier.

The temple of Baijnath (Lord Shiva) on the bank of the river is said to have been built by the Kumaon Katyuri king in around 1150 A.D. and it was Capital of the Katyuri dynasty of kings who ruled Uttaranchal during 12th and 13th century, Baijnath was once known as Kartikyapura. One of the most important places to visit in Baijnath is the historically and religiously significant Baijnath Temple constructed in the twelfth century. The temple holds significance because, according to Hindu mythology, Lord Shiva and Parvati were married at the confluence of River Gomati its other name in Hindu mythology known as GOMI River. It originated from Aana village path of the Kausani. Known as Pinath Velly. Here, Lord Shiva huge temple called Pinath Mandir) and Garur Ganga. Dedicated to SivaVaidyanatha, the Lord of Physicians, the Baijnath temple is actually a complex of temples built by the Katyuri kings with the idols of Shiva, Ganesh, Parvati, Chandika, Kuber, Surya and Brahma. Also the town of Baijnath draws its name from the temple. Situated on the left bank of the Gomti River at an elevation of 1,126 m above sea,  The stone carved temple that houses a beautiful idol of Parvati is chiselled in black stone. The temple is approached from the riverside by a flight of steps made of stones constructed by the orders of a Katyuri queen. On the way to the main temple, just below the house of the Mahanta, is the temple of Bamani. Legend goes that the temple was built by a Brahmin woman and dedicated to Lord Shiva.
There is also a famous Ram Mandir Gali in main market.

Economy 
There are only few lodging and boarding facilities at Garur, but two kilometres away Baijnath offers good and budget accommodation at the state run KMVN Tourist Reception Centre (Kumaon Mandal Vikas Nigam Limited). Two kilometres further is a heli-pad facility for emergency landing for state and defence usage.

The chief occupation of its inhabitants are farming, pensioners from retired services, State Government Teachers, Bankers, Post Officer Employees, Forest Services, agriculture, retired and serving defence personnel, petty and large shopkeepers dealing into day to day items and tea stall owners, central government employees and finally point small scale taxi services.

There is a market that provides household items, daily use goods to people. This is the biggest market place in the region after Almora, Ranikhet and Bageshwar District in Kumaon Hills up to Karanprayag District in Garhwal.

The market of Garur is one of the oldest in the region (since pre-independence days of the British Rule in India, but the market expanded during 1970 to 2010 with the efforts of social worker and industrialist K D Pandey). In 2011, the major banks and other government services - the polytechnic, post office and the two ATM of the region - are situated in Garur. Primarily, Garur is the last recognised and biggest Kumaon market prior to entering Garhwal via Kumaon en route to Garur Gwaldam road.

Many nationalised banks like Union Bank of India, PNB (Punjab National Bank), BOB (Bank of Baroda) with their ATM's and financial services are being established.

A central government scientific research center named CIMAP (Central Institute of Medicinal and Aromatic Plants) is situated near village "Purada".

Transport 
After Kausani, Garur is midway between Gwaldam and Bageshwar and is a major bus station for KMVN buses and approximately 490 kilometres from Delhi on route to Delhi-Gajraula-Muradabad-Bhowali-Khairna-Almora-Someshwar-Kausani-Garur-Baijnath-Gwaldam.

There is a bus service from Anand Vihar Bus Terminus in New Delhi and there are air-conditioned as well as non-air-conditioned buses travelling between Delhi to Bageshwar via Garur or Delhi to Tharali via Garur all plying in the evening. Train services i.e. Anand Vihar - Shatabdi Express Train available up to Kathgodown, Ranikhet Express as well as Sampark Kranti Express Train are available from Old Delhi Railway Station up to Kathgodam and also train services up to Kathgodam can be used from Lucknow, Jaipur, Derhradun and Kolkata.

References 

Cities and towns in Bageshwar district
Bageshwar